A Kiss Is Just a Kiss is a 1971 British television play written by Alec Coppel for Itelevision playhouse.

Premise
In Hollywood, wealthy young lawyer Kit Shaeffer visits his doctor for a check up.

Cast
David Hedison as Kit Shaeffer
Lelia Goldoni as Louise
Keir Dullea as Dr Alex Noon

References

External links
A Kiss Is Just a Kiss at IMDb
A Kiss Is Just a Kiss at BFI
A Kiss Is Just a Kiss stills at Keirdullea.org

1971 plays
1971 television films
1971 films
British television films
Films directed by Alvin Rakoff